Eomantis guttatipennis is a species of praying mantis in the family Nanomantidae. It is the type species of the genus Eomantis, having previously been placed in Tropidomantis. This species has been recorded from India, Nepal, Tibet, Myanmar and  Vietnam.

References 

Nanomantidae
Mantodea of Southeast Asia
Insects described in 1877
Taxa named by Carl Stål